Vodole is a dispersed settlement in the hills northeast of Maribor in northeastern Slovenia. It is a part of the City Municipality of Maribor.

Name
Vodole was attested in written sources as Wodul in 1259 (and as Wodel in 1265–1267 and Wodal in 1295). Like the related name Vodule, the name is derived from the accusative plural of the common noun *ǫdolъ 'small side valley', referring to the local geography.

References

External links
Vodole on Geopedia

Populated places in the City Municipality of Maribor